= 3.1 =

3.1 may refer to:

- An approximation of the mathematical constant π
- A shorthand reference to release 3.1 of some piece of software, such as Windows 3.1
